Urdu College railway station(Sindhi: اردو کالج اسٽيشن) is an abandoned railway station on Karachi Circular Railway loop line in Gulshan-e-Iqbal, Karachi, Pakistan.

See also
 List of railway stations in Pakistan
 Pakistan Railways

References

External links

Railway stations in Karachi
Railway stations on Karachi Circular Railway